Bowring Brothers Ltd. (or simply Bowring) was a Canadian operator of retail stores, mostly focused on gifts and home decor, throughout Canada.

History
Bowring was formed in 1811 as a private company by Benjamin Bowring and his family, who had just moved to St. John's, Newfoundland. Benjamin Bowring, an English clockmaker, set up shop in that business, while his wife Charlotte established a dry goods store which evolved into a large department store on Water Street.

Bowring Brothers was later engaged as a shipowner, fish and general merchant, and steamship agent. In the late 19th century, the Bowring Brothers chartered the ship Nelly, captained by Robert Austin Sheppard (1865–1909), to carry fish to ports in Pernambuco, Brazil and Sydney, New South Wales.  The Bowring Brothers ran the Red Cross Line of steamships around Newfoundland and Labrador. In particular, SS Florizel was one of the first passenger ships in the world specifically designed to navigate icy waters, useful also for seal hunting. Most famously, Florizel was converted into a troopship and in October 1914 carried the first 540 volunteers of the Newfoundland Regiment into World War I. The numerous vessels owned by the Bowring family between 1818–1937 were cataloged by Arthur Wardle.

From 1811 to date Bowring Brothers has been continuously engaged in Newfoundland's commerce, and at its peak the company had various operations on a global scale.

After World War II, the company focused on its retail business, including the department store in St. John's and a chain of over 100 gift shops in shopping malls across Canada and the US. By the late 1980s the Bowring family had sold the chain to American retailer Hallmark Cards, and in 1993 it was acquired by Royal Canadian Securities through subsidiary Tereve Holdings, following which the St. John's store closed, leaving Bowring without any retail presence in the province for over a decade.

Fred Benitah, owner and chief executive officer of the privately owned home-goods retailer Benix & Company, Inc. (based in Toronto, Ontario), purchased the insolvent Bowring Brothers chain in October 2005. Fred Benitah and his brother Isaac Benitah together privately controlled a number of retailers including Fairweather, International Clothiers and Benix & Co. Following this sale, Bowring began to shift its energy towards a series of "home stores" in power centres across Canada, at its peak numbering 34 — including one in St. John's — but continued to operate 31 mall stores in larger Canadian centres.

After U.S. retailer Bombay Company filed for Chapter 11 bankruptcy protection on September 20, 2007, Bombay's Canadian operations (after inventory disposition) were acquired by the Benitahs and combined operations with Bowring and Benix & Company.

Bankruptcy and liquidation
On November 6, 2018, Fluid Brands Inc (which supplies for Bowring and The Bombay Company) and is owned by retail mogul, Fred Benitah, claimed insolvency. They obtained protection from creditors under the Bankruptcy and Insolvency Act. According to documents, Fluid Brands Inc is 50 million in debt. As of November 2018, both Bowring and The Bombay Company have shut down all supplier websites and are in liquidation process. As of January 2019 all Bowring and Bombay stores are closed.

See also
Bowring Park (St. John's), a park built on land donated by the company
Bowring Downtown Centre, an office complex redeveloped from the former Bowring department store in St. John's

References

 
Defunct companies of Newfoundland and Labrador
Privately held companies of Canada
Home decor retailers
Retail companies established in 1811
Retail companies disestablished in 2019
Companies based in St. John's, Newfoundland and Labrador
Defunct shipping companies of Canada
1811 establishments in Canada
2019 disestablishments in Canada
1811 establishments in Newfoundland
2019 disestablishments in Newfoundland and Labrador
Canadian companies established in 1811
Canadian companies disestablished in 2019